is a form of Japanese Internet slang which first appeared around 2009. It involves taking sentences which are grammatically Japanese and stripping away the hiragana and katakana, leaving only the kanji behind, which causes the resultant sentence to appear Chinese. The phenomenon has spread to China, where Chinese speakers can often guess the meaning of the sentences despite not knowing Japanese. Taiwan's Central News Agency has hailed pseudo-Chinese as a new platform for Sino-Japanese communication.

This style of writing can lead to idiosyncratic word choices. For example, 非常感謝 (much appreciated) may be rendered as 大変感謝; while 感謝 (gratitude) is common to both languages, 非常 is used as an intensifier in Chinese whereas 大変 serves the same purpose in Japanese. Commentators on Baidu have noticed the similarity between pseudo-Chinese and Classical Chinese, with such expressions as 貴方明日何処行？ (Where will you go tomorrow?). This is not a coincidence; the Japanese writing system arose as an adaptation of classical Chinese writing.

See also 

 Kyowa-go
 Kanbun

References 

Japanese-based pidgins and creoles
Chinese Internet slang
Kanji